Malaysia is a country largely surrounded by large bodies of water, most notably by the Strait of Malacca and the South China Sea, that have been used extensively for maritime transport as early as the 15th century. Numerous lighthouses were erected during present-day Malaysia's rule by the Portuguese Empire, the Dutch Empire and the British Empire (which oversaw the greatest number of new lighthouses built), and, later, the government of Malaysia, to provide navigation in and out of ports or through dangerous seas. Many of these lighthouses are situated on small islands and headlands.

The following lists lighthouses situated within the borders of Malaysia.

Peninsular Malaysia

East coast 
Lighthouses situated on the east coast of Peninsular Malaysia are frequently used for navigation at the South China Sea, as well as beacons into minor ports along the coast.
 Bukit Puteri Lighthouse, Bukit Puteri, Terengganu
 Pantai Senok Lighthouse (Pengkalan Daty Lighthouse), Pantai Senok, Kelantan
 Pulau Mungging Lighthouse, Pulau Mungging, Johor
 Seabelle Rock Lighthouse, Perhentian Islands, Terengganu
 Tanjung Gelang Lighthouse, Tanjung Gelang, Pahang
 Tumpat Lighthouse, Tumpat, Kelantan

West coast 
The west coast of Peninsular Malaysia, which faces the Strait of Malacca, contains a large concentration of lighthouses aimed at navigation through the narrow strait, as well as serving to direct ships into major ports such as Port Klang, Malacca and Penang. Lighthouses in Johor are also used to guide ships into Singaporean waters, from which Singaporean counterparts provide navigation past the island or into the Port of Singapore. Most of the west coast lighthouses, as are Singapore's, are referred to as "The Straits Settlement Lighthouses", named after the former British-ruled territories that encompassed Singapore, Penang, Malacca and Dinding.
 Bukit Jugra Lighthouse, Bukit Jugra, Selangor
 Bukit Segenting Lighthouse, Tanjung Api Api, Johor
 Cape Rachado Lighthouse, Tanjung Tuan (Cape Rachado), Malacca
 Fort Cornwallis Lighthouse, Fort Cornwallis, George Town, Penang
 Kuala Kedah Lighthouse, Kuala Kedah, Kedah
 Kuala Selangor Lighthouse, Fort Altingsburg, Bukit Melawati, Selangor
 Malacca Light, Malacca City, Malacca
 Mudah Selatan Lighthouse, Johor
 Muka Head Lighthouse, Muka Head, Penang
 One Fathom Bank Lighthouse, Selangor
 Panjang Selatan Lighthouse, Johor
 Pulau Angsa Lighthouse, Pulau Angsa, Selangor
 Pulau Katak Lighthouse, Pulau Katak, Selangor
 Pulau Pisang Lighthouse, Pulau Pisang, Johor
 Pulau Sialu Lighthouse, Pulau Sialu, Johor
 Pulau Tikus Lighthouse, Pulau Tikus, Penang
 Rimau Island Lighthouse, Rimau Island, Penang
 Tanjung Piai Lighthouse, Tanjung Piai, Johor
 Undan Island Lighthouse, Undan Island, Malacca

Sabah 
Sabah, a Malaysian state on the island of Borneo, faces the South China Sea to the northwest, and the Sulu Sea to the northeast. The lighthouses are primarily used to navigate ships into smaller harbours such as Labuan and Tawau.

West 
 Pulau Kalampunian Lighthouse, Pulau Kalampunian, Sabah
 Pulau Kuraman Lighthouse, Pulau Kuraman, Sabah
 Pulau Mantanani Lighthouse, Pulau Mantanani, Sabah
 Pulau Papan Lighthouse, Pulau Papan, Sabah
 Pulau Tiga Lighthouse, Pulau Tiga, Sabah

East 
 Batu Tinagat Lighthouse, Batu Tinagat, Sabah
 Pulau Berhala Lighthouse, Pulau Berhala, Sabah
 Tanjung Trang Lighthouse, Tanjung Trang, Sabah

Sarawak 
Sarawak, another Malaysian state situated on the island of Borneo, operates lighthouses facing the South China Sea, which are all situated on headlands.
 Tanjung Baram Lighthouse, Tanjung Baram, Kuala Baram, Sarawak
 Tanjung Datu Lighthouse, Datu Peninsula, Sarawak
 Tanjung Jerijeh Lighthouse, Tanjung Jerijeh, Sarawak
 Tanjung Kidurong Lighthouse, Tanjung Kidurong, Bintulu, Sarawak
 Tanjung Lobang Lighthouse, Tanjung Lobang, Miri, Sarawak
 Tanjung Po Lighthouse, Tanjung Po, Sarawak
 Tanjung Sirik Lighthouse, Tanjung Sirik, Sarawak

See also 
 Lists of lighthouses and lightvessels
 Category of lighthouses in Singapore

Notes and references

External links

 

 
Malaysia
Lighthouses
Lighthouses